Sayeh Kor or Sayehkor, also rendered as Saikur or Sadeh Kor or Sayeh Gor or Sayeh Kur, may refer to:
 Sayeh Kor-e Olya
 Sayeh Kor-e Sofla